Captain (also known by its tagline Captain: Match Beginning Soon) is a 2019 Nepalese sports drama film directed by Diwakar Bhattarai, written by Samipya Raj Timalsena, Diwakar Bhattarai, Sagar Kharel, Brajesh Khanal and produced by Bhuwan K.C. and Jiya K.C. under the banner of Super Kajal Films. It stars Anmol K.C., with Sunil Thapa, Saroj Khanal, Wilson Bikram Rai, Upasana Singh Thakuri, Priyanka Mv, and Prashant Tamrakar. The film, which follows a teenager who struggles to follow his father's footsteps in football, was filmed across Jhapa and Ilam. It was released in Nepal on 1 March 2019. It received largely unfavourable reviews from critics for its storyline, visual special effects, and lead performances, and a mixed response from audiences. It grossed below average at the box office and ended its run after its second weekend.

Plot 
Madan Khadka (Saroj Khanal) was a talented footballer, but football cannot support his family, so he goes to Saudi Arabia to find work. His son, Ishan (Anmol K.C.), is following in his footsteps and wants to become a professional footballer. When his father is hurt in an accident abroad, Ishan faces a many problems his father is sick and admitted in hospital but he dreams of his father and his love for football. In the last moment he gets injured but he continues to play, and he wins the football game and the movie is finished with happy ending.

Cast 
 Anmol K.C. as Ishan Khadka
 Upasana Singh Thakuri as Shreya
 Priyanka Mv as Charu
 Sunil Thapa as the coach
 Prashant Tamrakar as Imam Bikram Thapa
 Saroj Khanal as Madan Khadka (Ishan's father)
 Bhuwan K.C. (cameo appearance in "Curly Curly Kapal")
 Niruta Singh (cameo appearance in "Curly Curly Kapal")

Soundtrack

Marketing 
The film's poster was released in August 2018, featuring lead actor Anmol K.C. and the tagline Match Beginning Soon. A trailer was released in February 2019.

Reception

Box office 
Captain grossed crore (million) at the box office in four days. By its second weekend, however, the film grossed crore (million) and ended its run.

Critical response 
Captain received poor reviews from critics. Abhimanyu Dixit of The Kathmandu Post called the film "an unintentional parody" and gave it one out of five stars, saying: "This is an honest cry, Bhuwan dai. Your audience is more mature than you think. Please surprise us by giving us something sensible the next time around". Diwakar Pyakurel of Onlinekhabar wrote: "This Anmol KC starrer is a story of makers' misses", and rated the film two out of five, saying: "Captain fails to establish itself as an example for other sports genre movies to take a leaf from in the future. Instead, like ordinary players, it makes some unsuccessful efforts to shine". The film did receive a positive review from Nepalese Prime Minister Khadga Prasad Oli, who said: "[The] movie is brilliant and it delivers patriotism, [a] social message with entertainment ... We need such content, which can boost the Nepali movie industry".

References

External links 
 

2019 films
Nepalese drama films
2010s Nepali-language films
Association football films
Films shot in India
Films shot in Sikkim
Films shot in Jhapa
Films about families
Films about father–son relationships
2010s sports drama films
2019 drama films
Films shot in Ilam